Paris to Pittsburgh is a 2018 television documentary film about climate change directed by National Geographic filmmaker Sidney Beaumont and documentarian Michael Bonfiglio and produced by Bloomberg Philanthropies, National Geographic and RadicalMedia. The film is narrated by Rachel Brosnahan.

The film was first broadcast on December 12, 2018 in the United States on National Geographic.

Background
The title of the documentary refers to the phrase used by President Trump on June 1, 2017 in his withdrawal speech delivered in the White House Rose Garden in which he announced that he was pulling the United States out of the Paris Agreement. Trump said, "I was elected to represent the citizens of Pittsburgh, not Paris." In response, Bill Peduto, Mayor of Pittsburgh, wrote: "As the Mayor of Pittsburgh, I can assure you that we will follow the guidelines of the Paris Agreement for our people, our economy and future."

Reviews

Notes

References

2018 documentary films
American documentary television films
2018 films
2018 television films
2010s English-language films
2010s American films